The Ada Express is a limited stop regional train service operating between Gebze, Kocaeli and Adapazarı. It was inaugurated on 5 January 2015 as the successor to the popular Adapazarı Express train service. However, unlike its predecessor, the Ada Express does not make local stops and run as often and it does not operate into central Adapazarı. Trains consist of TVS2000 cars and use E68000 series locomotives for motive power.

Gallery

References

Named passenger trains of Turkey
Railway services introduced in 2015